King of the World is a 1998 biography of Muhammad Ali written by David Remnick with a special focus on the period in Ali's life from his victory in the Olympics to his second fight with Sonny Liston. It has been described as "a book about a boxer, not a book about boxing."

During this time, the two prominent boxing contemporaries of Ali were Floyd Patterson and Sonny Liston. Patterson had the reputation of being a "Good Negro" and Liston that of a "Bad Negro." Ultimately Ali would transcend both stereotypes. In an interview with the author, Ali stated: "I had to prove you could be a new kind of black man. I had to show that to the world."

According to a review of the book in The New York Times,

References

Books about Muhammad Ali
Biographies about African-American people
1998 non-fiction books
Random House books